Taitetsu Unno (海野 大徹 Unno Taitetsu) was a scholar, lecturer, and author on the subject of Pure Land Buddhism.  His work as a translator has been responsible for making many important Buddhist texts available to the English-speaking world and he is considered one of the leading authorities in the United States on Shin Buddhism, a branch of Pure Land Buddhism. Dr. Unno was an ordained Shin Buddhist minister and the founding Sensei of the Northampton Shin Buddhist Sangha.

He published extensively on the subject of Pure Land Buddhism, his most famous works include: Shin Buddhism: Bits of Rubble Turn Into Gold; River of Fire, River of Water and Tannisho: A Shin Buddhist Classic.

Biography
Born in Japan in 1929, Taitetsu Unno immigrated to the United States at the age of six.  During World War II, following the enforcement of Executive Order 9066, he spent three and a half years imprisoned in the Rohwer internment camp in Arkansas, and Tule Lake in California.  He graduated from the University of California, Berkeley with a degree in English literature and received M.A. and Ph.D. degrees in Buddhist Studies from Tokyo University.

From 1971 to 1998 he taught Buddhism and Japanese aesthetics and was the Jill Ker Conway Professor Emeritus of Religion at Smith College.  He retired in December 1998.  After his retirement, he continued to travel as a lecturer on Japanese Buddhism, religion, and culture.

Unno died on December 13, 2014.

Essays
“Is There a God?  A Buddhist Answer” by Rev Taitetsu Unno
 “Contrasting Images of the Buddha” by Rev Taitetsu Unno

Bibliography
Buddhism of the Heart: Reflections on Shin Buddhism and Inner Togetherness [foreword] (Wisdom Publications, 2009) 
Coffinman: The Journal of a Buddhist Mortician [foreword] (Buddhist Education Center, 2004) 
The Global Myths: Exploring Primitive, Pagan, Sacred, and Scientific Mythologies [preface] (Plume, 1994) 
Living in Amida's Universal Vow: Essays in Shin Buddhism [contributor] (World Wisdom, 2004) 
Mahayana Buddhism: An approach to its essence (Pure Land Publications, 1989) 
Notes on "Essentials of Faith Alone": A Translation of Shinran's Yuishinsho-mon'i[translator] (Hongwanji International Center, 1979) 
Praying With Our Hands: 21 Practices of Embodied Prayer from the World's Spiritual Traditions [afterword] (Skylight Paths Publishing, 2000) 
 River of Fire, River of Water (Image, 1998) 
 [with James W. Heisig (editors)], The Religious Philosophy of Tanabe Hajime: The Metanoetic Imperative(Nanzan Studies in Religion and Culture), Asian Humanities Press (June 1990), .
Sermons of a Buddhist Abbot: A Classic of American Buddhism [introduction] (Three Leaves, 2004)  
Shin Buddhism: Bits of Rubble Turn into Gold (Image, 2002) 
Shin Buddhism: Monograph Series (Pureland Publications, 1993) 
The Spirit of Aikido [translator] (Kodansha America, 1984) 
Tannisho: A Shin Buddhist Classic [translator] (Buddhist Study Center Press, 1996)

External links
Northampton Shin Buddhist Sangha
Author Page

References

1929 births
2014 deaths
American Buddhists
American Buddhist studies scholars
Japanese scholars of Buddhism
UC Berkeley College of Letters and Science alumni
University of Tokyo alumni
Smith College faculty
Pure Land Buddhism
Buddhist writers
Buddhist translators
Japanese-American internees
Japanese emigrants to the United States
20th-century Japanese translators